Alejandro Guillermo Domínguez Wilson–Smith (born 25 January 1972) is a Paraguayan football administrator, president of CONMEBOL, a vice-president of FIFA and a member of the FIFA Council.

Early life
Domínguez was born on 25 January 1972, the son of Osvaldo Domínguez Dibb (a wealthy businessman and football administrator) and Peggy Wilson-Smith.

Career
Dominguez was elected president of CONMEBOL in January 2016. He was the only candidate, after Wilmar Valdez of Uruguay withdrew, and was elected unanimously.

Dominguez succeeded his close friend, fellow Paraguayan Juan Ángel Napout, who was arrested in Switzerland in December 2015 and extradited to the US. All three previous CONMEBOL presidents are facing US indictments for corruption.

References

1972 births
Living people
FIFA officials
Paraguayan people of English descent
Paraguayan people of Lebanese descent
Paraguayan sports executives and administrators
Presidents of CONMEBOL
Association football executives
Universidad Católica Nuestra Señora de la Asunción alumni
University of Kansas alumni
Sportspeople of Lebanese descent